Lewis Colbert (born August 23, 1963) is a former American football punter. He played for the Kansas City Chiefs from 1986 to 1987 and for the San Diego Chargers in 1989.

References

1963 births
Living people
American football punters
Auburn Tigers football players
Kansas City Chiefs players
San Diego Chargers players